Chittaguppa is a taluka and tehsil in Bidar district of Karnataka. Up until 2017, the city was under the administration of Humnabad. Chitguppa is divided into 23 wards. The city is known for having the largest marketplace in the Bidar district and its corn production.It shares border with Kalaburagi district.The nearest highway is NH-65 which passes through Chitguppa taluk.

History
The Chitgoppa area, formerly known as the Chitgoppa Empire, was formerly under the control of the Nizams who established Sadar Diwani Adalat and Moffusil as their courts. Patwardhan Saheb was the first President of the Chitguppa municipality and Kishan Rao Saheb was the President of the Municipality for three consecutive terms until he voluntarily stepped down.

The town has two Muslim dargahs (dedicated to Salar Makdum and Karimullah) where the annual Urs (prayer meetings) are held. Every year in August a fair is held for the Hindu god Baloba. A marble statue of a Hindu saint Mahadevappe Devarshi has been installed in a monastery named after him in the town. A temple in Chitguppa is Bhavani mandir which was established by the members of Bhavasar kshatriya Samaj the temple was very old after every Navratri there was a celebration of temple palki at the time of Vijayadashami. The speciality of this temple is in Navarathri Dasara. Its one of the memorable event, lots of devotees will visit on that day and make Pllaki Seva. This temple has very big history bind it.

Geography 
Chitguppa is divided into 23 wards. Coordinates are 17.6979° N, 77.2155° E. Area of 2.317 mi2.

Demographics

According to the 2011 Census of India, Chitgoppa had a population of 25,298: males constituted 51% of the population and females 49%. 13.33% of the population was under six years of age. Chitguppa had an average literacy rate of 71.88%, lower than the state average of 75.36%, with male literacy at 77.76% and female literacy at 65.75%. The Chitgoppa Town Municipal Council oversaw over 4,445 houses, to which it supplied basic amenities.

References

Cities and towns in Bidar district
Bhavani mandir chitguppa